The 1998 Pacific hurricane season was a below average Pacific hurricane season. Despite this, it had nine hurricanes and six major hurricanes, which was well above average. The season officially started on May 15 in the eastern Pacific and on June 1 in the central Pacific, and ended on November 30; these dates conventionally delimit the period during which most tropical cyclones form in that region. The first tropical cyclone developed on June 11, about ten days later than the normal start of the season. The final storm of the year, Hurricane Madeline, dissipated on October 20. Storm activity in the Central Pacific Hurricane Center's warning zone was low, with just one tropical depression observed in the region. Two tropical cyclones from the eastern Pacific (Darby and Estelle) also entered the central Pacific; the former did so as a hurricane.

The most notable tropical cyclone of the year was Hurricane Isis, which killed fourteen people when it made landfall on southern Baja California Sur and coastal Sinaloa in Mexico. Isis caused considerable damage in the nation while destroying more than 700 homes and damaging dozens of cars. It later produced sporadic rainfall in the southwestern United States, leading to some traffic accidents. In addition to Isis, Tropical Storm Javier moved ashore the coast of Jalisco in Mexico; the country also experienced indirect effects from four other storms, all of which remained offshore. One tropical cyclone, Hurricane Lester, affected Central America, causing two deaths in Guatemala, and later brought heavy rains to southern Mexico. Three tropical cyclones brought light to moderate rainfall to the southwestern United States, and one hurricane produced rough surf along the coast of California. Hurricane Madeline contributed to a deadly and costly flood in southern Texas.

Seasonal summary 

The season produced 13 named storms, slightly below the average of 15 named storms per season. However, the season total of nine hurricanes was one above the average, and the total of six major hurricanes surpassed the average of three. Activity during the season was hindered by the northward movement of the Intertropical Convergence Zone (ITCZ). The ITCZ, which is normally situated south of the Gulf of Tehuantepec, shifted northward into Central and Southern Mexico, making the cyclone closer to cooler sea surface temperatures, hence limiting the number of storms that formed during the season. Although a semi-permanent anticyclone persisted through the summer of 1998, causing most of the storms to remain at sea, some storm did threaten the Baja California Peninsula due to a weakness in the anticyclone. Except for Hurricane Kay, all of the storms of the season originated from tropical waves.
Accumulated Cyclone Energy is, broadly speaking, a measure of the power of a storm multiplied by its duration, so longer-lived hurricanes have higher ACEs. The total ACE for the season was 133.97 × 104 kt2. Because several storms in 1998 were long-lasting or intense, the season's ACE was near-normal. Hurricane Howard had the highest ACE, measuring 29.27 x 104 kt2.

Systems

Tropical Storm Agatha 

A poorly defined tropical wave crossed Central America into the eastern Pacific Ocean on June 8. As it tracked westward under the influence of a ridge to its north, a broad circulation developed. Gradually, the dominant center of circulation became better defined, with increasingly organized convection and developing banding features.

The center of the depression was not initially well defined, with restricted outflow in the eastern half of the circulation. As such, the depression failed to attain any significant organization in the days subsequent to its formation. Later, an approaching tropical wave merged with the depression, resulting in a trend of intensification and increased organization. By June 13, the NHC upgraded the depression to tropical storm status, and gave it the name "Agatha". As Agatha became a tropical storm, forecasters predicted that it would not strengthen further, due to its forecast track passing over cooler waters. Agatha maintained peak winds for about 12 hours before moving over colder waters and gradually weakening. On June 15, it degenerated back into a tropical depression, and a day later, it dissipated over the open waters of the Pacific Ocean. The storm never affected land.

Tropical Depression Two-E 

A few days later, another westward-moving tropical disturbance paralleled the southern coast of Central America and Mexico. On becoming a tropical depression, the system maintained a large, elongated, low-level circulation with some banding features and restricted outflow due to wind shear. Under the influence of a ridge over Mexico, the depression moved to the west-northwest, and, under the influence of increasing wind shear, the depression failed to organize significantly. By June 20, the circulation center was partially exposed, and was located to the northeast of the primary convection – traits that signal a weak storm. Two-E approached tropical storm status, though deep convection waned after the system moved over cooler waters. On June 21, the National Hurricane Center issued the last advisory on the depression, stating that the depression maintained a very well-defined, low-level circulation, but had no convection associated with the system.

Hurricane Blas 

On June 8, a tropical wave emerged off the coast of Africa. The wave remained weak and nondescript as it crossed the Atlantic Ocean and entered the eastern Pacific Ocean on June 19. An area of convection developed and organized along the wave's axis, and the National Hurricane Center began to employ Dvorak classifications on June 20. Well-defined steering currents resulted in a general west-northwestward movement.

Tropical Storm Blas continued to organize as it moved parallel to the Mexican coast. The next day, an eye developed and became apparent on satellite imagery, while upper-level outflow became better defined. Temperatures warmed in the convection around the eye, though the eye remained visible for several days as Blas turned west under the influence of a ridge to its north. On June 28, it degenerated into a tropical storm after entering an area of cooler water. Blas weakened to a tropical depression on June 30, and a day later was considered to have dissipated due to a lack of convection near the center. A remnant low-level cloud swirl persisted for several days, passing well to the south of Hawaii on July 5 before dissipating. The Associated Press attributed 4 deaths from a mudslide in Michoacán to Blas. However, as the primary convection remained offshore, the National Hurricane Center did not consider the deaths related to the hurricane. The threat of Blas prompted officials in Acapulco to close the port to all navigation.

Tropical Storm Celia 

On July 1, another tropical wave emerged off the coast of Africa. It moved westward due to strong wind shear without further organization, and crossed Central America into the eastern Pacific Ocean on July 11. An area of organizing convection developed along the wave axis, and Dvorak classifications began on July 13, while the tropical wave was south of the Gulf of Tehuantepec. The cloud pattern soon became disorganized, and the area of disturbed weather continued west-northwestward. Soon after becoming a tropical depression, the storm rapidly organized and intensified into Tropical Storm Celia six hours after becoming a tropical depression. The tropical storm initially moved northwestward, and briefly threatened southern Baja California. As a result, the government of Mexico issued a tropical storm warning on July 18 for La Paz southward. On July 19, Celia attained maximum sustained winds of  before moving over cooler waters and diminishing in convection. The storm degenerated into a tropical depression on July 20, and Celia dissipated early on July 21, well away from the Mexican coastline.

The precursor tropical disturbance produced locally heavy rainfall along the south coast of Mexico. Authorities in Mexico closed the port at Acapulco to small fishing and recreational boats, and advised larger craft to use caution. Damage from the storm, if any, is unknown.

Hurricane Darby 

A tropical wave moved off the coast of Africa on July 4. It tracked westward across the Atlantic Ocean with little increase in convection, and crossed Central America into the Pacific Ocean on July 16. Three days later, convection began to increase along the wave axis while the wave was well to the south of Acapulco, Mexico. On July 21, Dvorak classifications began as the cloud pattern displayed curvature on satellite images. Under the influence of a mid- to upper-level ridge to its north, the depression tracked west-northwestward. Convection became more concentrated as outflow organized further, and 18 hours after the depression first developed, it intensified into Tropical Storm Darby.

Located in an area conducive to further development, Darby attained hurricane status on July 24, subsequent to the development of a -wide eye. For a 30-hour period, Darby attained the characteristics of an annular hurricane, retaining a well-defined structure with few banding features for an extended period. The hurricane began to weaken while entering an area of cooler water and increased wind shear, and after crossing into the jurisdiction of the Central Pacific Hurricane Center, Darby weakened to a tropical storm on July 29. The storm degenerated into a tropical depression on July 31, and early on August 1, Darby dissipated a moderate distance north of the Hawaiian Islands. It never affected land.

Hurricane Estelle 

On July 18, a tropical wave exited the western coast of Africa, and moved westward across the Atlantic Ocean with sporadic convection but no development. The wave moved across the Caribbean Sea and the southern Gulf of Mexico before crossing Central America into the eastern Pacific Ocean on July 28. The depression continued to organize, with increasing convection and distinct upper-level outflow, and early on July 30 the depression intensified into Tropical Storm Estelle.

Tropical Storm Estelle gradually intensified as it tracked west-northwestward, a motion caused by a large anticyclone to its north. The hurricane soon began to weaken as deep convection diminished and the eye disappeared on satellite imagery. Two days after peaking in intensity, Estelle weakened to tropical storm status. Late on August 4, the convection associated with the storm dissipated, and the next day the storm weakened to tropical depression status. Convection briefly re-developed on August 6, though increased wind shear and cooler water weakened the depression further. High surf from Estelle impacted southern California, resulting in a number of lifeguard rescues. The storm disrupted the trade winds around Hawaii, resulting in light winds and rain showers on Kauai and Oahu.

Tropical Storm Frank 

On July 19, a tropical wave moved off the coast of Africa. A mid-level circulation developed to the south of Cape Verde on July 22, though the wave became less distinct as it continued westward. The wave axis crossed Central America into the eastern Pacific Ocean on July 31. Convection steadily increased, though it was not until August 4 that the convection began to organize. The depression tracked generally northward, under the influence of a ridge over Mexico and a mid-level trough to its west. The center of the depression was initially elongated, with northerly wind shear impacting the structure of the cyclone. This at first prevented further strengthening, though convection increased and organized into banding features as it moved through an area of warm water. On August 8, the depression intensified into Tropical Storm Frank, and it soon turned to the north-northwest, brushing the western coastline of Baja California. It turned to the northwest, with a portion of the circulation of the land, and steadily weakened after moving over cooler water. On August 10, Frank dissipated a short distance off Baja California.

On August 8, the government of Mexico issued a tropical storm warning for portions of the southwestern Baja California Peninsula. Officials ordered the evacuation of some residents near Cabo San Lucas, whose port was closed, due to the threat of mudslides. One news agency attributed three deaths to the storm, though elsewhere there were no reports of damage.

Hurricane Georgette 

A tropical wave was first observed in the eastern Pacific Ocean on August 4 in association with the Intertropical Convergence Zone. It tracked westward, and by August 9 a low-level circulation formed well to the south of Mexico. On becoming a tropical cyclone, the depression maintained an area of concentrated deep convection near the center. The National Hurricane Center initially predicted that the depression would slowly intensify and reach winds of  within 72 hours. For much of the rest of the storm's duration, the National Hurricane Center underestimated the intensity of the cyclone.

The depression tracked steadily northwestward, caused by its location along the western periphery of a subtropical ridge. It would retain that direction for most of its remaining duration. The eye became increasingly distinct while banding features became very well organized. The hurricane soon moved over cooler water, and began to weaken as convection warmed and decreased. On August 16, it degenerated into a tropical storm, and Georgette dissipated on August 17 without ever affecting land.

Tropical Depression One-C 

An area of convection developed in association with a northward bulge of the near-equatorial convergence zone. The depression failed to organize significantly as it turned westward. It never affected land.

Hurricane Howard 

A tropical wave moved off the coast of Africa on August 7. As it moved across the Atlantic Ocean, it failed to organize. On reaching the eastern Pacific Ocean on August 17, however, an area of convection developed along the wave axis. Dvorak classifications began the next day, and a broad center of circulation gradually formed. It tracked generally west-northwestward, developing more pronounced banding features, and on August 21, the depression intensified into Tropical Storm Howard. The center of Howard became embedded within the deep convection, and the storm quickly strengthened to attain hurricane status late on the 21st. At the time of its peak intensity, the eye was small and located within a very cold central dense overcast.

Shortly after peaking in intensity, the eye of Hurricane Howard gradually became larger, resulting in a slight weakening trend. Howard strengthened again into a Category 4 hurricane on August 25 before weakening slightly the following day. The hurricane retained annular characteristics for about 48 hours before moving over cooler water. On August 28, it weakened to a tropical storm, and early on August 30, Howard was considered to have dissipated. A small, low-level swirl of clouds devoid of convection persisted for a few days before dissipating. Howard never affected land.

Hurricane Isis 

Isis developed on September 1 out of the interaction between a tropical wave and a large, low-level circulation to the southwest of Mexico. It moved northward, striking the extreme southeastern portion of the Baja California Peninsula before attaining hurricane status in the Gulf of California. Isis made landfall at Topolobampo in the state of Sinaloa on September 3 and quickly lost its low-level circulation. The remnants persisted for several days before dissipating in the US state of Idaho.

The rainfall caused widespread damage to roads and railways, stranding thousands of people. Moisture from the remnants of Isis extended into the southwestern United States, resulting in light rainfall, dozens of traffic accidents, and power outages for thousands of residents in San Diego County.

Tropical Storm Javier 

Javier is believed to have originated from a tropical wave that moved off the coast of Africa on August 22. A convective disturbance along the northern portion of the wave developed into Atlantic Hurricane Danielle on August 24, while the southern portion of the wave axis continued westward. The wave remained inactive and difficult to track as it crossed the Atlantic. On September 3, an area of convection began to develop near Acapulco, at the same time and location where the wave would have been based on extrapolation.

Easterly wind shear initially dislocated the circulation center to the eastern edge of the convection. The subtropical ridge to its north resulted in a general west-northwest motion, and the depression slowly intensified into Tropical Storm Javier late on September 7. Steering currents soon weakened, and the storm turned to the east while convection quickly decreased. By September 9, the center was exposed from the diminishing deep convection, and that night it degenerated into a tropical depression. On September 11, the National Hurricane Center issued its final advisory on Javier, though later analysis indicates that it remained a tropical cyclone as it turned southeastward. At times, it became difficult to distinguish Javier from the broader area of disturbed weather that persisted over the tropical eastern Pacific, though a brief increase in convection and a ship report of winds exceeding  indicate that Javier strengthened again into a tropical storm late on September 12. It turned to the northeast, and reached winds of  before weakening due to waning convection.

The National Hurricane Center advised small craft along coastal areas of Mexico to monitor the progress of the storm. Damage, if any, is unknown.

Tropical Depression Twelve-E 

The depression failed to organize and gradually worsened in appearance. Early on October 2, two ships reported southwest winds much further to the north, with the National Hurricane Center indicating that either the center was exceedingly small, that no center existed at the time, or that the center was located far to the north of the thunderstorm activity. By early October 3, the depression possessed only intermittent convection, and later that day it dissipated to the southwest of the Baja California peninsula.

Hurricane Kay 

A small, low-level circulation separated itself from the Intertropical Convergence Zone on October 10, several hundred miles southwest of Baja California. The circulation was well defined, though its convection was initially minimal and disorganized. Operationally, the depression was forecast to intensify to reach peak winds of  while tracking steadily west-northwestward.

The storm center was at first ill-defined, and post-season analysis estimates that it intensified into Tropical Storm Kay about 6 hours after developing. After becoming a tropical storm, Kay rapidly organized as it tracked generally westward. A pinhole eye developed in the center of the convection, and Kay attained hurricane status late on October 13, about 18 hours after developing. After remaining a hurricane for about 12 hours, the eye disappeared and the convection weakened, and early on October 14 Kay degenerated into a tropical storm. Within an environment of weak steering currents, the storm turned to the southwest, then to the south, after weakening to a tropical depression on October 15. Convection sporadically redeveloped, but failed to persist. Kay never affected land.

Hurricane Lester 

A tropical wave moved off the coast of Africa on September 29, and on October 5, an area of convection along the wave developed into Atlantic Hurricane Lisa. It moved northwestward and late on the 15th it intensified into Tropical Storm Lester, about /h) south of the border of Mexico and Guatemala, before attaining hurricane status on October 16. Late on October 23, it degenerated into a tropical storm, and several days later, Lester dissipated on October 26.

Early in its lifetime, Lester produced heavy rainfall across southwestern Guatemala. The rainfall destroyed some houses and killed livestock, and a mudslide from the heavy precipitation killed two children. In Honduras, rainfall from the hurricane destroyed a bridge in Tegucigalpa, affecting about 1,000 people. Moisture brought around the northeast periphery of the Sierra Madre Occidental led to a narrow band of heavy rainfall along the upslope side of the mountain range, with a local precipitation maximum exceeding . Though no surface reports are available, it is estimated that tropical-storm-force winds occurred along coastal areas of southern Mexico.

Hurricane Madeline 

A tropical wave moved off the coast of Africa on September 25, and remained disorganized while crossing the Atlantic Ocean before crossing Central America into the Pacific Ocean. At the western end of a mid-level ridge, the depression tracked north-northwestward. 12 hours after first developing, the depression intensified into Tropical Storm Madeline. Banding features gradually improved in organization, and late on October 17, Madeline attained hurricane status. Late on October 19, the hurricane degenerated into a tropical storm, and early on October 20, Madeline dissipated in the southern portion of the Gulf of California.

Some of the rainbands from Madeline moved over portions of southwest Mexico, with close to  falling at Cabo Corrientes. No damage or casualties were reported as a result of the storm in Mexico. Thirty-one people died due to the flooding, and damage totaled $750 million (1998 USD).

Storm names 

The following names were used to name storms that formed in the northeastern Pacific Ocean during 1998. No retired names were announced by the World Meteorological Organization in the spring of 1999, so they were used again in the 2004 season. This is the same list used in the 1992 season.

For storms that form in the Central Pacific Hurricane Center's area of responsibility, encompassing the area between 140 degrees west and the International Date Line, all names are used in a series of four rotating lists. The next four names that were slated for use in 1998 are shown below, however none of them were used.

Season effects 
This is a table of all the tropical cyclones that formed in the 1998 Pacific hurricane season. It includes their duration, names, intensities, areas affected, damages, and death totals. Deaths in parentheses are additional and indirect (an example of an indirect death would be a traffic accident), but were still related to that storm. Damage and deaths include totals while the storm was extratropical, a wave, or a low, and all the damage figures are in 1998 USD.

See also 

 1998 Atlantic hurricane season
 1998 North Indian Ocean cyclone season
 1998 Pacific typhoon season
 Australian region cyclone seasons: 1997–98, 1998–99
 South Pacific cyclone seasons: 1997–98, 1998–99
 South-West Indian Ocean cyclone seasons: 1997–98, 1998–99
 List of Pacific hurricanes
 Pacific hurricane season

References

External links 

 NHC 1998 Pacific hurricane season archive
 HPC 1998 Tropical Cyclone Rainfall pages
 Central Pacific Hurricane Center archive

 
Pacific hurricane seasons